SS St. Louis, was a transatlantic passenger liner built by the William Cramp & Sons Building & Engine Company, Philadelphia and was launched on 12 November 1894; sponsored by Mrs. Grover Cleveland, wife of the President of the United States; and entered merchant service in 1895, under United States registry for the International Navigation Co., of New York City with her maiden voyage between New York and Southampton, England. She was acquired by the United States Navy during the Spanish–American War and commissioned under the name USS St. Louis in 1898, and again during World War I under the name USS Louisville (ID-1644) from 1918 to 1919. After she reverted to her original name in 1919, she burned in 1920 while undergoing a refit. She was scrapped in 1924 in Genoa.

Service history

Spanish–American War
On a later voyage following the outbreak of the Spanish–American War, St. Louis was chartered for Naval service while at Southampton and returned to New York on 22 April 1898. Armed with four 5-inch rapid fire guns and eight 6-pounders, she was commissioned as an auxiliary cruiser in the United States Navy on 24 April, Capt. Caspar F. Goodrich in command. Manned by 27 officers and 350 men, she put to sea on 30 April for the Caribbean.

St. Louis was specially outfitted with heavy drag lines in order to destroy undersea cable communications in the West Indies and to the mainland of South America. On 13 May, she severed the cable between St. Thomas and San Juan; and five days later exchanged fire with the Morro Castle batteries at Santiago de Cuba as she cut the cable between that port and Holland's Bay, Jamaica. When Admiral Pascual Cervera's fleet sailed into Santiago Harbor, the Spanish warships found themselves cut off from direct communications with Spain.

St. Louis next severed the cable between Guantanamo Bay and Haiti; then cut the cable off Cienfuegos to isolate Cuba from outside communications. She joined in the bombardment of fortifications at Caimanera in Guantanamo Bay on 3 June; captured a Spanish merchant ship on the 10th; intercepted two British ships bound for Cuba - the Twickenham on 10 June and Wary on 1 July; and was present at the Battle of Santiago de Cuba on 3 July when the Spanish Fleet was destroyed while trying to force its way to sea.

St. Louis received many prisoners of war, including Admiral Cervera, for internment in the United States and landed them at Portsmouth, N.H., on 11 July. She steamed south from Norfolk on the 28th to cruise among ports of Puerto Rico and Cuba until 10 August; then sailed for New York where she arrived on the 14th. She shifted to Philadelphia on 24 August to enter the Cramp shipyard for preparation for return to her owners. St. Louis was decommissioned on 2 September and was turned over to Mr. J. Parker, a representative of the American Lines.

World War I
For many years, SS St. Louis was prominent as a passenger liner between New York and Liverpool.  For example, in June 1906, the newly married Alice Roosevelt Longworth sailed on the ship for her first trip to Europe. On 17 March 1917, the ship was furnished an armed guard of 26 United States Navy sailors and armed with three 6-inch guns, to protect her from enemy attack as she continued her New York-to-Liverpool service. On 30 May, while proceeding up the Irish Sea and skirting the coast of England, she responded rapidly to the orders, "Hard Starboard," at the sighting of a periscope, and succeeded in dodging a torpedo while apparently striking the submarine which fired it. Later dry-dock examination revealed that 18 feet of her keel rubbing strake had been torn away. On 25 July, her gunners exchanged fire with a surfaced U-boat, some three miles away, and sighted many near misses.

On 17 April 1918, St. Louis was delivered to the Navy at New York to be wholly manned and operated by the Navy as a troop transport. She was renamed Louisville (SP-1644), as a cruiser named St. Louis was already in service in the Navy. Louisville was commissioned on 24 April.

Louisville first put to sea on 12 October bound for Portland and Southampton, England, and returned to New York on 7 January 1919. From then until 19 August of that year, she made six voyages from New York to Liverpool or to Brest, France, to return American soldiers from the Great War. On 20 August, she shifted to Norfolk and was decommissioned there on 9 September 1919. She was returned to her owner on the 11th and resumed her original name, St. Louis.

Destruction
To be reconditioned as a passenger liner, St. Louis entered a shipyard at Hoboken, N.J., where on the evening of 8 January 1920, a workman's gasoline blow torch set her afire. She burned into 9 January. After control of the fire was lost, she was scuttled alongside the dock and allowed to burn out. Nothing but the steel hull remained. Damages were estimated at $1 million. She was later refloated and taken over by insurance underwriters. Over the next five years, under ownership of various investors, she lay at docks in different parts of New York Harbor. Finally, she was sold in 1925; and two Dutch tugs towed her to Italy where she was scrapped by an Italian salvage company.

Notes

References

External links
 "The New American Atlantic Liner St. Louis", Scientific American, 11 August 1894

Passenger ships of the United States
Ships built by William Cramp & Sons
1894 ships
World War I transports of the United States
Spanish–American War auxiliary ships of the United States
Maritime incidents in 1920